Henry Robert Steel (born 7 October 1989) is a South African chess player. He was awarded the title International Master by FIDE in 2014. He has won the South African Chess Championship twice, in 2007 and 2011 (jointly with Watu Kobese).

Steel played for the South African national team at the Chess Olympiads of 2008, 2010, 2012 and 2014, and at the All-Africa Games in 2007 and 2011, winning the team silver medal both times. In 2011 he also won an individual silver playing the top board.

He tied for 2nd–3rd place with Essam El Gindy in the 2011 African Chess Championship, taking third place on tie-break. This result qualified him for the FIDE World Cup, held later that year. Here he was knocked out by Vassily Ivanchuk in the first round.

References

External links

Henry Robert Steel chess games at 365Chess.com

1989 births
Living people
South African chess players
Chess International Masters
Chess Olympiad competitors
African Games silver medalists for South Africa
African Games medalists in chess
Competitors at the 2007 All-Africa Games
Competitors at the 2011 All-Africa Games
Place of birth missing (living people)